John Edward Wheeler (26 July 1928 – 15 November 2019) was an English professional footballer. He played for Tranmere Rovers, Bolton Wanderers, Liverpool and New Brighton.

Club career
Wheeler played club football for Carlton, Tranmere Rovers, Bolton Wanderers, Liverpool and New Brighton.

Wheeler played for Bolton Wanderers in the 1953 FA Cup Final at Wembley on 2 May 1953 in which Bolton lost 4–3 to Blackpool.

International career
He gained his only England cap in 1954 when Walter Winterbottom selected him to play in a British Home Championship match against Northern Ireland at Windsor Park, Belfast. Goals from Johnny Haynes and Don Revie gained England a 2–0 win.

Coaching career
Following his retirement from being a player in 1963, Wheeler went on to become assistant trainer at Bury.

Later life and death
Wheeler died in November 2019, aged 91.

References

External links
Player profile at LFChistory.net
Bolton past players at Walking down the Manny Road

1928 births
2019 deaths
Tranmere Rovers F.C. players
Bolton Wanderers F.C. players
Liverpool F.C. players
New Brighton A.F.C. players
England international footballers
England B international footballers
English footballers
English Football League players
Association football wing halves
People from Crosby, Merseyside
English Football League representative players
FA Cup Final players